Barleeiidae (often also spelled Barleeidae) is a family of minute sea snails, micromollusks in the clade Littorinimorpha.

These snails are very abundant and live in sublittoral and intertidal waters on rocky substrates.

The shells are conical to high-spired. Their inner shell layer is chitinous. They are further characterized by a foot with sometimes a posterior mucous gland. Their olfactory organ, the osphradium is enlarged. In some species there are oesophageal pouches present. Their penis is sometimes provided with prostatic tissue. Their oviduct glands show a simple histology.<ref>Ponder W. F. (1983). "Review of the genera of the Barleeidae (Mollusca: Gastropoda: Rissoacea)". Records of the Australian Museum 35: 231-281.</ref>

Few malacologists are currently working on micromollusks. Since they are so small (only a few millimeters in size), they are difficult to study and classify. Therefore, these small mollusks are less well known than the larger ones.

 Genera 
Genera in the family Baleeiidae include:Ansola Slavoschevskaya, 1975Barleeia Clark, 1853 - Barleysnails Caelatura Conrad, 1853Fictonoba Ponder, 1967Ketosia Dos Santos & Absalao, 2006Lirobarleeia Ponder, 1983Protobarleeia Ponder, 1983Pseudodiala Ponder, 1967Tropidorissoia Tomlin & Shackleford, 1915

 References 

 Ponder W. F. (1983). Review of the genera of the Barleeidae (Mollusca: Gastropoda: Rissoacea). Records of the Australian Museum 35: 231-281 
 Vaught, K.C. (1989). A classification of the living Mollusca''. American Malacologists: Melbourne, FL (USA). . XII, 195 pp.
 Gofas S. (1995). A remarkable species richness of the Barleeidae (Gastropoda: Rissoacea) in the Eastern Atlantic. The Nautilus 109(1): 14-37

External links

 Taxonomy

 
Taxa named by John Edward Gray